Świecie nad Osą is a village in Grudziądz County, Kuyavian-Pomeranian Voivodeship, in north-central Poland. It is the seat of the gmina (administrative district) called Gmina Świecie nad Osą.

The village has a population of 870.

History
During the German occupation of Poland (World War II), Świecie nad Osą was one of the sites of executions of Poles, carried out by the Germans in 1939 as part of the Intelligenzaktion.

References

Villages in Grudziądz County